The symposium was an Ancient Greek social institution.

Symposium may also refer to:

Academia and scholarship
 Symposium (Plato), a dialogue by Plato
 Symposium (Xenophon), a dialogue by Xenophon
 Symposium: Canadian Journal of Continental Philosophy, an academic journal
 Academic conference, an academic gathering concerning a scholarly subject

Arts and entertainment
 Symposium (band), a British band
 Symposium (Feuerbach), a pair of 19th-century paintings by Anselm Feuerbach
 Symposium (novel), a 1990 novel by Muriel Spark
 "Sympozium", a song by Dimmu Borgir from Puritanical Euphoric Misanthropia